The following is a timeline of the history of the city of Mérida, Yucatán, Mexico.

Prehistory
 66 million years ago - The ground beneath Mérida forms part of the impact crater of the meteorite linked to the Cretaceous–Paleogene extinction event, centred offshore to the North of the city.

Prior to 20th century

 1542 – Mérida founded by Francisco de Montejo the Younger on site of former city T'ho.
 1547 – Franciscan convent active.
 1549 – Montejo's residence.
 1561 – Mérida Cathedral construction begins.
 1598 – Mérida Cathedral construction completed.
 1618 – School of Mérida opens.
 1624 –  established.
 1648 – Yellow fever epidemic.
 1823 – Yucatán becomes part of Mexico.
 1847 – Caste War of Yucatán begins.
 1869 –  newspaper begins publication.
 1888 - Paseo de Montejo opened.
 1892 – Government Palace (Palacio de Gobierno) built.
 1900 – Population: 43,630.

20th century

 1908 - Museum of the City of Merida initiated.
 1910 –  founded.
 1922 – Universidad Nacional del Sureste established.
 1925 – Diario de Yucatán newspaper begins publication.
 1929 – Airport begins operating.
 1949 – Cine Teatro Mérida opens.
 1950 – Population: 144,793.
 1957 – Monumento a la Patria erected on the Paseo Montejo.
 1962 – Instituto Tecnológico de Mérida established.
 1978 – Pacheco murals in the Palacio de Gobierno completed.
 1988 – The city is hit by Hurricane Gilbert.
 1993 – Catholic Pope John Paul II visits city.
 1999 – Bill Clinton visits the city in a binational meeting.
 2000 – The city is designated as the 1st American Capital of Culture.

21st century

 2001 -
Yucatan Symphony Orchestra founded.
Ana Rosa Payán becomes as the 29th mayor for a second period.
 2002 – The city is hit by Hurricane Isidore.
 2003 – C.F. Mérida football club formed.
 2004 – Manuel Fuentes Alcocer becomes the 30th mayor.
 2005 – The city held the International Mathematical Olympiad.
 2006 – Mérida host the 18th International Olympiad in Informatics.
 2007 -
George W. Bush is received in Mérida, here he signs the Mérida Initiative.
César Bojórquez Zapata becomes the 31st mayor.
 2009 – The city held the 40th International Physics Olympiad.
 2010
 Angélica Araujo Lara becomes the 32nd mayor.
 Population: 777,615; Metropolitan Area 973,046.
 2011
 The International Committee of the Banner of Peace titled Merida as "City of Peace".
 The city held the II Alianza del Pacífico summit.
 2012 – Alvaro Lara Pacheco becomes acting mayor, few months later Renán Barrera Concha wins the local election and he becomes the 34th mayor.
 2014 – Mérida hosted the VI Summit of Association of Caribbean States, more than 25 Heads of State members came to the city.
 2015
 Mauricio Vila Dosal becomes the 35th mayor.
 Raul Castro, President of Cuba is received by President Enrique Peña Nieto in his first visit as President, to Mexico. Here he announced his retirement on 2018.
 2018 
 María Dolores Fritz Sierra becomes the 36th mayor, as acting mayor in office.
 The 3rd presidential debate of the 2018 general elections is hosted at the Mayan Museum of Merida
 Renán Barrera Concha becomes the 37th mayor. First constitutionally re-elected after the 2015 constitutional reform.
 2019
 The city hosted the 17th World Summit of Nobel Peace Laureates, receiving more than 30 of them.

See also
 Mérida history
 List of municipal presidents of Mérida
 Yucatán history and

References

This article incorporates information from the Spanish Wikipedia.

Bibliography

in English
 
 
 
 
 
 
  (fulltext via OpenLibrary)

in Spanish

External links

  (includes Merida)
 Digital Public Library of America. Items related to Mérida, various dates

Mérida, Yucatán
Merida
Merida